The lesser petrosal nerve (also known as the small superficial petrosal nerve) is the general visceral efferent (GVE) component of the glossopharyngeal nerve (CN IX), carrying parasympathetic preganglionic fibers from the tympanic plexus to the parotid gland. It synapses in the otic ganglion, from where its postganglionic fibers emerge.

Structure

Course 
The nucleus of the lesser petrosal nerve is the inferior salivatory nucleus. The lesser petrosal nerve may be considered a continuation of the tympanic nerve.

After arising in the tympanic plexus, the lesser petrosal nerve passes forward and then through the hiatus for lesser petrosal nerve on the anterior surface of the petrous part of the temporal bone into the middle cranial fossa.  It travels across the floor of the middle cranial fossa, then exits the skull via canaliculus innominatus to reach the infratemporal fossa. The fibres synapse in the otic ganglion, and post-ganglionic fibres then travel briefly with the auriculotemporal nerve (a branch of V3) before entering the body of the parotid gland.

The lesser petrosal nerve distributes its post-ganglionic parasympathetic (GVE) fibers to the parotid gland via the intraparotid plexus (or parotid plexus), the branches from the facial nerve in the parotid gland.

See also
Tympanic nerve
Glossopharyngeal Nerve, Overview of visceral motor component

References

External links
 Lesser petrosal nerve diagram 
 
  (#7)
 
 

Glossopharyngeal nerve
Visceral motor nerves